The Eastern Hemisphere is the half of the planet Earth which is east of the prime meridian (which crosses Greenwich, London, United Kingdom) and west of the antimeridian (which crosses the Pacific Ocean and relatively little land from pole to pole). It is also used to refer to Afro-Eurasia (Africa and Eurasia) and Australia, in contrast with  the Western Hemisphere, which includes mainly North and South America. The Eastern Hemisphere may also be called the "Oriental Hemisphere", and may in addition be used in a cultural or geopolitical sense as a synonym for the "Old World."

Geography 
The almost perfect circle (the earth is an oblate spheroid that is fatter around the equator), drawn with a line, demarcating the Eastern and Western Hemispheres must be an arbitrarily decided and published convention, unlike the Equator (an imaginary line encircling Earth, equidistant from its poles), which divides the Northern and Southern Hemispheres. The prime meridian at 0° longitude and the antimeridian, at 180° longitude, are the conventionally accepted boundaries, since they divide eastern longitudes from western longitudes. This convention was established in 1884 at the International Meridian Conference held in Washington, D.C. where the standard time concepts of Canadian railroad engineer Sir Sandford Fleming were adopted. The Hemispheres agreed do not correspond with exact continents. Portions of Western Europe, West Africa, Oceania, and extreme northeastern Russia are in the Western Hemisphere, divorcing it from the continents which form the touchstone for most geopolitical constructs of "the East" and "the West".

Consequently, the meridians of 20°W and the diametrically opposed 160°E are often used outside of matters of physics and navigation, which includes all of the European and African mainlands, but also includes a small portion of northeast Greenland (typically reckoned as part of North America) and excludes more of eastern Russia and Oceania (e.g., New Zealand). Prior to the global adoption of standard time, numerous prime meridians were decreed by various countries where time was defined by local noon (thereby, local ).

The center of the Eastern Hemisphere is located in the Indian Ocean at the intersection of the equator and the 90th meridian east, 910 km west of Indonesia in the Ninety East Ridge.

The land mass of the Eastern Hemisphere is larger than that of the Western Hemisphere and has a wide variety of habitats.

Demographics 
82-88% of humans live in the Eastern Hemisphere, and 12-18% in the Western Hemisphere.

See also
 East Antarctica
 Eastern world
 Western Hemisphere

References

External links
 

Hemispheres of Earth